Megan Amy Lear (born 31 August 1951) is an English former cricketer who played as a right-handed batter. She appeared in 9 Test matches and 16 One Day Internationals for England between 1976 and 1985, and coached England during the 1997 World Cup. She also played 5 matches for Young England at the 1973 World Cup. She played domestic cricket for Kent and East Anglia.

References

External links
 

1951 births
Living people
England women Test cricketers
England women One Day International cricketers
Kent women cricketers
East Anglia women cricketers
Young England women cricketers